Sen Do Joint Stock Company is a Vietnamese e-commerce retailer and online commerce platform.  It is a subsidiary of Vietnamese software conglomerate FPT Corporation. According to iPrice’s third-quarter statistics for 2019, Shopee and Sendo emerged as Vietnam’s top two largest e-commerce platforms by web traffic.

Notable acquisitions 

On 7 July 2014, Sendo acquired its rival, a  Vietnamese e-commerce pioneer 123 Mua from consumer technology company VNG Corporation for VND10 billion ($US 469,500). 123 Mua's customer base reportedly included 30 million online shoppers. 34 million out of Vietnam's 90-million population use the Internet.  As of May 2015, 123 Mua (translated from Vietnamese as "123 buy") continues to operate as a separate website at 123mua.vn. In 2017, all traffic to 123mua.vn's domain was redirected to Sendo.vn.

In February 2020, the news raised up on a potential merger between Sendo and another rival, a Vietnamese B2C e-commerce Tiki.vn Both companies rejected commenting on this matter.

Investments

2014 investment round 
In December 2014, three prominent Japanese companies, SBI Holdings, Econtext Asia, and BEENOS, jointly signed a series A funding agreement with Sendo. The investment deal transferred a 33 percent stake in Sendo JSC to the Japanese enterprises while FPT retained the remaining 67 percent. The amount of the deal was later disclosed to be 2 billion yen ($18 million)

Series B investment  
The Sen Do Technology JSC (Sendo) announced on August 16 that it had secured an investment of $51 million in a Series B round, gaining SoftBank Ventures Korea, Daiwa PI Partners, and SKS Ventures as new investors. The funding round from investors in Japan, South Korea, and Taiwan was participated by all existing investors, including SBI Group, FPT Group, eContext Asia, BEENEXT, and BEENOS.

“The funding will help the company expand the Sendo C2C platform, launch the SenMall B2C marketplace, and make SenPay the leading fintech platform in Vietnam,” said Mr. Nguyen Dac Viet Dung, Executive Chairman and Co-Founder of Sendo. “Our ultimate goal is to continue to support hundreds of thousands of Vietnamese sellers to prosper and, along the way, help create millions of jobs. Having achieved an annualized gross merchandise value of $330 million, the company is on track to surpass $1 billion in gross merchandise value in 2020.”

Series C funding 
In November 2019, Sendo announced that it secured an investment of USD 61 million in Series C financing—the company’s largest funding round to date.
This is also one of the largest deals for Vietnam’s tech scenes in 2019. Sendo’s existing investors—including SBI Group, Beenos, SoftBank Ventures Asia, Daiwa PI Partners, and Digital Garage—expressed strong support via the investment. Additionally, EV Growth from Indonesia and Kasikornbank from Thailand joined the roster as new investors.

Hai Linh Tran, CEO and co-founder of Sendo said that the funds would be used to expand the breadth of its existing offerings to both sellers and consumers, as well as further deepen its technology moat with artificial intelligence and machine learning to improve the overall consumer experience. Linh said the Sendo has hit the annualized GMV target of USD 1 billion earlier than expected but is looking for “meaningful and sustainable GMV growth.”

References

External links
 
Online retailers of Vietnam